The year 1998 is the second year in the history of M-1 Global, a mixed martial arts promotion based in Russia. In 1998 M-1 Global held 2 events beginning with, M-1 MFC: World Championship 1998.

Events list

M-1 MFC: World Championship 1998

M-1 MFC: World Championship 1998 was an event held on February 14, 1998, in Saint Petersburg, Russia.

Results

M-1 MFC: European Championship 1998

M-1 MFC: European Championship 1998 was an event held on April 10, 1998, in Saint Petersburg, Russia.

Results

See also 
 M-1 Global

References

M-1 Global events
1998 in mixed martial arts